Lars Gaute Bø (born 20 November 1963) is a Norwegian footballer. He played in one match for the Norway national football team in 1987.

References

External links
 

1963 births
Living people
Norwegian footballers
Norway international footballers
Place of birth missing (living people)
Association football goalkeepers
Bryne FK players
Viking FK players